Cefn Coed railway station served the suburb of Cefn-coed-y-cymmer, Glamorgan, Wales, from 1867 to 1964 on the Brecon and Merthyr Tydfil Junction Railway.

History 
The station opened as Cefn on 1 August 1867 by the Brecon and Merthyr Tydfil Junction Railway. 'Coed' was added to its name on 1 May 1920. 'Halt' was also added to its name in 1934, but this only appeared in Bradshaw. The station closed to passengers on 13 November 1961 and closed to goods on 4 May 1964.

References

External links 

Former Brecon and Merthyr Tydfil Junction Railway stations
Former London and North Western Railway stations
Railway stations in Great Britain opened in 1867
Railway stations in Great Britain closed in 1961
1867 establishments in Wales
1964 disestablishments in Wales